This article is a list of Arizona Diamondbacks broadcasters. The following is a historical list of the all-time Arizona Diamondbacks broadcasters: 

Television Analysts
 Rod Allen, Television Analyst (1998–2002)
 Bob Brenly, Television Analyst (1998–2000, 2013–present)
 Joe Garagiola, Television Analyst	(1998–2012)
 Luis Gonzalez, Television Analyst (2012–present)
 Mark Grace, Television Analyst (2004–2012)
 Steve Lyons, Television Analyst (2003–2004)
 Jim Traber, Television Analyst (2001–2003)

Television Play-by-Play
 Steve Berthiaume, Television Play-by-Play (2013–present)
 Thom Brennaman, Television Play-by-Play (1998–2006)
 Greg Schulte, Radio and Television Play-by-Play (1998–present)
 Daron Sutton, Television Play-by-Play (2006–2012)
 Rich Waltz, Television Play-by-Play (2022–present)

Radio
 Rod Allen, Radio Analyst (1998–2002)
 Thom Brennaman, Radio Play-by-Play (1998–2006)
 Tom Candiotti, Radio Analyst (2006–present)
 Mike Ferrin, Fill-In/Secondary radio play-by-play (2016–2021)
 Chris Garagiola, Fill-In/Secondary radio play-by-play (2022-present)
 Jeff Munn, Fill-in/Secondary Radio Play-by-Play (2001–2015)
 Ken Phelps, Radio Analyst	(2004)
 Greg Schulte, Radio Play-by-Play (1998-present)
 Miguel Quintana, Spanish Radio Play-by-Play (1998–present)
 Victor Rojas, Radio Analyst (2003)
 Richard Saenz, Spanish Radio Analyst (2001–present)
 Oscar Soria, Spanish Television and Radio Analyst (2000–present)
 Jim Traber, Radio Analyst (2001–2003)

See also
 List of current Major League Baseball broadcasters

 
Arizona Diamondbacks
Broadcasters
Fox Sports Networks
Bally Sports